N series may refer to:
Nokia Nseries, smartphone and tablet product family
Netflix Series, a TV show produced by Netflix
Isuzu Elf, known outside Japan as the N series
Honda N engine
Ford Model N
Ford N-series tractor
Scania N series
Contax N-series cameras
900 hp (670 kW) N series of EMC Winton-engined switchers
Ghandhara Industries N-series vehicles
Acer N series, a series of PDAs
Australian passport, N series
"N" series ("nonperforming") mortgage trusts of the Resolution Trust Corporation
N (video game) and its sequels
Waco N series, biplanes
N series, the seventeenth (2016–17) series of QI

See also
 M series (disambiguation)
 O series (disambiguation)